Dale Appleby (born 19 December 1986) is a Welsh former road racing cyclist, who competed professionally between 2006 and 2016. He represented Wales in the 2006 Commonwealth Games.

Appleby joined the new  squad for the 2014 season.

Major results

2005
 1st Mountains classification Tour of South
 3rd Legstretchers Memorial to Betty Pharoah
 4th Road race, Welsh National Road Championships
 4th Overall P&O Irish Sea International Tour of North RR
2006
 1st Road race, Welsh National Road Championships
 British National Road Championships
3rd Time trial
4th Road race
 3rd Perfs Pedal road race
2007
 5th Cerbaia di Lamporecchion
2008
 3rd Overall Bikeline 2 Day
2010
 1st Road race, Welsh National Road Championships
2011
 10th Ryedale Grand Prix
2012
 5th Severn Bridge Road Race
2013
 3rd Circuit d'Alger
 6th Overall Tour d'Algérie
2014
 7th National Circuit Race Championships
2015
 5th National Circuit Race Championships
 6th Hitter Road Race
 8th Overall Totnes-Vire Stage Race
 8th Stafford Kermesse
 9th Otley Grand Prix
 10th Stafford GP
 10th Ryedale Grand Prix
2016
 1st Severn Bridge Road Race
 1st Scorpion CS Road Race
 2nd Chorley Grand Prix

References

External links

Living people
Sportspeople from Pontypridd
Welsh male cyclists
Welsh track cyclists
Commonwealth Games competitors for Wales
Cyclists at the 2006 Commonwealth Games
1986 births